Cleophas Lunga is the Anglican Bishop of Matabeleland. He was born in Bulawayo in 1966.

Background
He was educated in Roman Catholic schools and was temporarily employed by the Catholic Church but joined the local Anglican Church in 1986. He worked as a clerk in a legal office for three years before pursuing theological studies at Bishop Gaul Theological College, Harare. He was ordained Deacon in 1993 and posted to St Andrew's in Bulawayo.

The following year he was made a priest and assigned to the Cathedral in Bulawayo as assistant priest and Diocesan youth chaplain.

In 1999 he was appointed rector of All Saints and St Modwen in what was a multi-racial parish in the same city.

In 2003, he accepted a post as team vicar for St Catherine's United Kingdom, the job evolved and he became Team Vicar with special responsibility for Holy Cross and St Michael's, within the Caludon Team Ministry.

Since his time in Coventry Cleophas has undertaken post-graduate study at Coventry University, attaining an MA focusing on Peace and Reconciliation.

He was consecrated and enthroned Bishop of Matabeleland on 1 March 2009.

.

Notes

1966 births
Anglican bishops of Matabeleland
21st-century Anglican bishops in Africa
Living people